The 1963 Golden State 400 was a NASCAR Grand National Series event that was held on November 3, 1963, at Riverside International Raceway in Riverside, California.

The transition to purpose-built racecars began in the early 1960s and occurred gradually over that decade.  Changes made to the sport by the late 1960s brought an end to the "strictly stock" vehicles of the 1950s.

Background
Riverside International Raceway a race track or road course in Moreno Valley, California. The track was in operation from September 22, 1957, to July 2, 1989.  The original course design proved to be dangerous, and it was partially reconfigured in 1969.

The track was built to accommodate several different configurations, depending on the type of car and race length. The three options on Riverside Raceway were the long course, the short course, and the NASCAR course. The original racetrack had a  backstretch from 1957 to 1968. When the track was redesigned in 1969, Turn 9 was reconfigured with a wider radius and a dogleg approach added to reduce strain on the cars' brakes.

Race report
This event took four hours and twenty-one seconds to resolve itself; Darel Dieringer defeated Dave MacDonald by at least one lap. Dave MacDonald led most of this race until he lost 3rd gear.

More than 32000 people would watch a 148-lap race on a road course spanning  and speeds averaging . Dan Gurney won the pole position driving at speeds of up to  but Marvin Panch substituted for him on the day of the race. Only one caution was given out for the entire racing event. Forty-one American-born races would qualify for this race and Bruce Worrell would finish in last place due to an engine problem on the first lap of the race. This would end up becoming the only 1963 race of 300 miles or more where a Holman-Moody Ford failed to secure a place in the top two.

Fred Lorenzen only ran just over half the races, focusing on the super speedways, and finished third in points by a good margin over Ned Jarrett, who ran nearly all of them. Lorenzen had a pretty good run going early in this one as led 20 laps right at the start before the transmission failed in his signature #28 Ford.

Ken Miles, a legendary sports car racer with the Ford GT40 program, makes his only NASCAR start and finishes just outside the top-10 despite obtaining a considerable amount of damage during the race. Miles was a test driver for Carroll Shelby and he wasn't the only Shelby-connected competitor in this race as Pete Brock, the designer of the iconic Shelby Daytona Coupe, made his only NASCAR Cup start and brought home the #211 Kraco Safety Belts Mercury with a top-20 despite being sidelined by fuel problems. The race purse would add up to $33,780 ($ when adjusted for inflation); with the winner receiving $7,875 ($ when adjusted for inflation) and the last place finisher receiving only $200 ($ when adjusted for inflation).

Joe Weatherly would go on to win the 1963 title over Richard Petty, who overshadowed Weatherly in nearly every statistical category that year. The points were paid per the "importance" of each race. Superspeedway races were paid a certain higher amount. 250 mile major short track races were paid a little lower and short track races of less than 250 miles were paid the lowest amount. 

Notable crew chiefs who actively participated in the race were Herb Nab, Bradley Denis, Mario Rossi, and Louis Clements. Richard Petty attempted to drive five laps using automatic transmission but his transmission failed after only five laps into the race; proving that NASCAR may always be for vehicles with manual transmission. He would go on to become a replacement driver for Junior Johnson; although Johnson got credit for the fifth-place finish.

Qualifying

Failed to qualify: Danny Weinberg (#3), A. J. Foyt, Parnelli Jones, Rodger Ward, Roger Penske 
Driver change: Dan Gurney (#121) replaced by Marvin Panch

Top 10 finishers

Timeline
Section reference: 
 Start of race: Fred Lorenzen leaves the start/finish line as the lead driver.
 Lap 1: Rex White had a terminal crash, forcing him to retire from the race.
 Lap 22: Dave MacDonald takes over the lead from Fred Lorenzen.
 Lap 42: Paul Goldsmith had a terminal crash, forcing him out of the race.
 Lap 44: Bob Bondurant had a terminal crash, forcing him out of the race.
 Lap 67: Scotty Cain fell out with engine failure.
 Lap 74: Chuck Shove fell out with engine failure.
 Lap 77: Darel Dieringer takes over the lead from Dave MacDonald.
 Lap 80: Dave MacDonald takes over the lead from Darel Dieringer.
 Lap 116: Darel Dieringer takes over the lead from Dave MacDonald.
 Lap 117: Jimmy Pardue's vehicle had a major case of transmission issues.
 Lap 118: Dave MacDonald takes over the lead from Darel Dieringer.
 Lap 119: Darel Dieringer takes over the lead from Dave MacDonald.
 Lap 133: Jim Cook had a terminal crash, forcing himself to exit the race prematurely.
 Lap 134: Pete Brock managed to run out of fuel while racing.
 Finish: Darel Dieringer was officially declared the winner of the event.

References

Golden State 400
Golden State 400
NASCAR races at Riverside International Raceway